Burberry Perry is the self-made debut extended play by American hip hop recording artist TheGoodPerry. It was self-released on May 4, 2016. The EP consists of 6 tracks and was produced entirely by Perry himself, with guest appearances from artists such as Lil Yachty, Kylie Jenner, Justine Skye and Jordyn Woods.

Critical reception
Tiny Mix Tapes included the EP in their 2016 Second Quarter Favorites list, calling it "thrilling, intoxicating, transcendent even" and likening it to "a crystalline broadcast from an alternate Earth, one where Steve Reich and Brian Eno were as seminal influences on rap music as James Brown and Sly Stone."

Track listing
All tracks produced solely by TheGoodPerry.

References 

2016 EPs
Hip hop albums by American artists
Alternative hip hop EPs